One Born Every Minute is a British observational documentary series which shows activities taking place in the labour ward. The first series aired on Channel 4 starting February 9, 2010, the second in 2011. Series 7 made its debut on 10 March 2015. This factual series is produced by Dragonfly Film and Television Productions, which is part of Shine Group.

Series overview

Episode list

Series 1 

One Born
Lists of British non-fiction television series episodes